In inversive geometry, an inverse curve of a given curve  is the result of applying an inverse operation to . The point  in this construction is called the center of inversion, the circle the circle of inversion, and  the radius of inversion.

An inversion applied twice is the identity transformation, so the inverse of an inverse curve with respect to the same circle is the original curve. Points on the circle of inversion are fixed by the inversion, so its inverse is itself.

Equations
The inverse of the point  with respect to the unit circle is  where

or equivalently

It is clear from this that inverting an algebraic curve of degree  with respect to a circle produces an algebraic curve of degree at most .

Similarly, the inverse of the curve defined parametrically by the equations

with respect to the unit circle is given parametrically as

This implies that the circular inverse of a rational curve is also rational.

The inverse of the curve defined parametrically by

with respect to the same circle is given parametrically as

In polar coordinates, the equations are simpler when the circle of inversion is the unit circle. The inverse of the point  with respect to the unit circle is  where

Degrees
As noted above, the inverse with respect to a circle of a curve of degree  has degree at most . The degree is exactly  unless the original curve passes through the point of inversion or it is circular, meaning that it contains the circular points, when considered as a curve in the complex projective plane. In general, inversion with respect to an arbitrary curve may produce an algebraic curve with proportionally larger degree.

The value  can be eliminated from these relations to show that the set of -circular curves of degree , where  may vary but  is a fixed positive integer, is invariant under inversion.

Examples
Applying the above transformation to the lemniscate of Bernoulli

gives us

the equation of a hyperbola; since inversion is a birational transformation and the hyperbola is a rational curve, this shows the lemniscate is also a rational curve, which is to say a curve of genus zero.

If we apply the transformation to the Fermat curve , where  is odd, we obtain

Any rational point on the Fermat curve has a corresponding rational point on this curve, giving an equivalent formulation of Fermat's Last Theorem.

Particular cases
For simplicity, the circle of inversion in the following cases will be the unit circle. Results for other circles of inversion can be found by translation and magnification of the original curve.

Lines
For a line passing through the origin, the polar equation is  where  is fixed. This remains unchanged under the inversion.

The polar equation for a line not passing through the origin is

and the equation of the inverse curve is

which defines a circle passing through the origin. Applying the inversion again shows that the inverse of a circle passing through the origin is a line.

Circles
In polar coordinates, the general equation for a circle that does not pass through the origin (the other cases having been covered) is

The equation of the inverse curve is then

or

This is the equation of a circle with radius

and center whose polar coordinates are

Note that  may be negative.

If the original circle intersects with the unit circle, then the centers of the two circles and a point of intersection form a triangle with sides  this is a right triangle, i.e. the radii are at right angles, exactly when

But from the equations above, the original circle is the same as the inverse circle exactly when

So the inverse of a circle is the same circle if and only if it intersects the unit circle at right angles.

To summarize and generalize this and the previous section:
 The inverse of a line or a circle is a line or a circle.
 If the original curve is a line then the inverse curve will pass through the center of inversion. If the original curve passes through the center of inversion then the inverted curve will be a line.
 The inverted curve will be the same as the original exactly when the curve intersects the circle of inversion at right angles.

Parabolas with center of inversion at the vertex
The equation of a parabola is, up to similarity, translating so that the vertex is at the origin and rotating so that the axis is horizontal, . In polar coordinates this becomes

The inverse curve then has equation

which is the cissoid of Diocles.

Conic sections with center of inversion at a focus
The polar equation of a conic section with one focus at the origin is, up to similarity

 

where e is the eccentricity. The inverse of this curve will then be

 

which is the equation of a limaçon of Pascal. When  this is the circle of inversion. When  the original curve is an ellipse and the inverse is a simple closed curve with an acnode at the origin. When  the original curve is a parabola and the inverse is the cardioid which has a cusp at the origin. When  the original curve is a hyperbola and the inverse forms two loops with a crunode at the origin.

Ellipses and hyperbolas with center of inversion at a vertex
The general equation of an ellipse or hyperbola is

Translating this so that the origin is one of the vertices gives

and rearranging gives

or, changing constants,

The equation of the inverse is

or

This equation describes a family of curves called the conchoids of de Sluze. This family includes, in addition to the cissoid of Diocles listed above, the trisectrix of Maclaurin and the right strophoid.

Ellipses and hyperbolas with center of inversion at the center
Inverting the equation of an ellipse or hyperbola

gives

which is the hippopede. When  this is the lemniscate of Bernoulli.

Conics with arbitrary center of inversion
Applying the degree formula above, the inverse of a conic (other than a circle) is a circular cubic if the center of inversion is on the curve, and a bicircular quartic otherwise. Conics are rational so the inverse curves are rational as well. Conversely, any rational circular cubic or rational bicircular quartic is the inverse of a conic. In fact, any such curve must have a real singularity and taking this point as a center of inversion, the inverse curve will be a conic by the degree formula.

Anallagmatic curves
An anallagmatic curve is one which inverts into itself.  Examples include the circle, cardioid, oval of Cassini, strophoid, and trisectrix of Maclaurin.

See also
 Inversive geometry
 Inversion of curves and surfaces (German)

References

 
 
 
 
 "Inversion" at Visual Dictionary Of Special Plane Curves
 "Inverse d'une Courbe par Rapport à un Point" at Encyclopédie des Formes Mathématiques Remarquables

External links
 Definition at MacTutor's Famous Curves Index. This site also has examples of inverse curves and a Java applet to explore the inverse curves of every curve in the index.

Curves
Projective geometry
Inversive geometry